is a 3D weapons-based fighting game developed by Nextech and published by Takara, the same companies that created the Battle Arena Toshinden series, which the game is inspired from. The endings for the characters teased a sequel, but it never happened.

Gameplay
Players choose their fighter and fight through the cast in the common fighting game fashion. Players are able to strafe using the Saturn shoulder buttons as well as performing attacks with the strafe command such as grabs and special moves. Depending on the opponent, the arena will either consist of a ring or a cage. Players (and opponents as well) have the ability to avoid falling out of the ring by pressing the jump button just as they are about to fall. Players and enemies alike can also use the walls of a caged arena to deal extra damage on an opponent by knocking them against the cage's walls.

Characters

Initially playable characters
Boy
Weapon: Cannon blade

The protagonist of the story, Boy is seeking revenge against the assassinations of his mother and lover. Although he knows that their murderers are working for a cult that is seeking him out, he is unaware that they are doing so because he holds an ancient and powerful evil spirit inside him known only as The Shadow.

Seiya
Weapon: Flamberge

Seiya is a young hunter and rival of Boy, who has been hired to eliminate him and, consequentially, the evil force that dwells inside him.

Lucifer
Weapon: Scythe

Sanjuroh
Weapon: Kotetsu sword

Sabrina
Weapon: Stun baton

Merow
Weapon: Saber

Karen
Weapon: Twin chakram

Karen is a schoolgirl and a close friend of Boy, who wants to help him get rid of the ancient evil that lies within him. However, she is being pursued by Kohjin, who believes she is being possessed by the ghost of Boy's deceased lover.

Kohjin
Weapon: Tessen

Soatome
Weapon: Twin kodachi

Soatome is an assassin, skilled in various forms of black magic, who works in the same department as Sabrina. However, he also wishes to be the leader of the underground society that seeks out Boy.

Schneider
Weapon: Cannon staff

Unlockable characters
Venus
Weapon: Trident

Izanagi
Weapon: Razor gauntlets

Shadow Boy

A palette swap of Boy, depicting him as being possessed by the evil force inside him.

Eiji Shinjo
Weapon: Byakko katana

Reception
Next Generation reviewed the Saturn version of the game, rating it two stars out of five, and stated that "If Namco's Soul Edge is a Lexus, then D-Xhird is a Hyundai. Not a lot of frills, but it gets the job done. Barely."

GameSpot's  Ryan Mac Donald gave D-Xhird a negative calling it "by far, the worst fighter I've ever played. He criticized multiple aspects of the game such as the sound, graphics and the gameplay itself, he said of the game's sound production "When someone gets hit, it sounds like a water bottle being dropped on the ground. Plus, nearly every second of play is plagued by the annoying sound of weapons clashing. It pains me just to think about it.".  Complaints were also given of the way the game implements combo attacks and the designs of the weapons themselves.  In conclusion, he wrote " How could a company release a game like D-Xhird with a clear conscience? They had to know that the game they were working on was devoid of value. Saturn owners waiting for another good 3-D fighting game can just keep on waiting. This one isn't worth the CD it's burned on. The game was given a rating of 1.4/10 and called abysmal by Mac Donald and maintains a rating of 5.5/10 from 42 user ratings on the GameSpot website as of August 2019.

CGR Publishing known at the time as classic game room or simple CGR did a youtube review of the game praising D-Xhird for its graphics and controls but criticizing the character designs saying, "I've gotta compliment the backgrounds, they look really good even if the fighter designs are kind of lacking it's got a bit of a Battle Arena Toshinden feel to it but less cheesy 1:43-1:53".  In conclusion, the reviewer said of the game, "This one's not bad, I've played better I've played worse 4:48-4:51.

In Japan, Famitsu gave it a score of 23 out of 40.

Reviews
GameFan # 56 (Vol 5, Issue 8) 1997 August
Power Unlimited - Sep, 1997

References

1997 video games
Fighting games
Japan-exclusive video games
Multiplayer and single-player video games
Nex Entertainment games
Sega Saturn games
Sega Saturn-only games
Takara video games
Video games developed in Japan